Pometenik is a mountain in Bosnia and Herzegovina.

Geography
It is located near the city of Mostar.

See also
List of mountains in Bosnia and Herzegovina

References

Mountains of Bosnia and Herzegovina